is an element of traditional Japanese etiquette which involves kneeling directly on the ground and bowing to prostrate oneself while touching one's head to the floor. It is used to show deference to a person of higher status, as a deep apology or to express the desire for a favor from said person.

In general, dogeza is translated into English as "prostration" or "kowtow".

The meaning of performing dogeza
In the Japanese social consciousness, the act of sitting on the ground and creating a scene (dogeza), is an uncommon deference only used when one is deviating greatly from daily behavior. It is seen as part of etiquette and filled with the feeling of being sorry about troubling the other person. By performing dogeza and apologizing to someone, usually the other person would have a tendency to forgive.

History

In the Gishiwajinden (魏志倭人伝), the oldest Chinese record of encounters with the Japanese, it was mentioned that commoners of the ancient Yamataikoku would, upon meeting noblemen along the road, fall prostrate on the spot, clapping their hands as in prayer (柏手 read: kashiwade), and this is believed to be an old Japanese custom.

The haniwa of the Kofun period can be seen prostrating themselves in dogeza.

In the early modern period, popularly as the daimyōs procession passed by, it is believed that it was mandatory for the commoners present to perform dogeza, but that is incorrect. It was normal for common people to perform dogeza in modern times when being interviewed by higher-ups.

Even now, as a method of self-protection and apology in which damage to one's image is neglected, its idea of feeling shame remains firmly rooted.

See also
 
 Kowtow
 Sujud
 Japanese culture
 Genuflection
 Prostration
 Prostration (Buddhism)
 Bowing in Eastern Orthodox Church tradition

References

Japanese culture
Human positions
Gestures of respect
Kneeling